The Lantau Link, formerly known as the Lantau Fixed Crossing, is a roadway in Hong Kong forming part of Route 8 linking Lantau Island to Tsing Yi, from which other roads lead to the urban areas of Kowloon and the rest of the New Territories. Part of the Airport Core Programme centred on the new Hong Kong International Airport on Lantau, the link was officially opened on 27 April 1997, and it opened to traffic on 22 May the same year.

Infrastructure
 the Tsing Ma Bridge, a suspension bridge linking Tsing Yi to Ma Wan island
 the Ma Wan Viaduct, a viaduct crossing Ma Wan
 the Kap Shui Mun Bridge, a cable-stayed bridge linking Ma Wan to Lantau Island

Link is split into two traffic levels; the upper level is an open, 3-lane divided highway, while the lower level is a double-track railway line used by the MTR Airport Express and Tung Chung line and also contains two single-lane roads for emergency use in both directions. In normal situations, the lower level is not used except in special circumstances such as strong wind or serious accidents which could lead to the closure of the upper level. The lower level is not connected to Ma Wan.

The Lantau Link is one of the two land passageway connecting Lantau and other parts of Hong Kong; Tuen Mun–Chek Lap Kok Link via Tuen Mun has opened on 27 December 2020 as the second land connection, reducing the traffic pressure on Lantau Link.

Near the Tsing Yi end of the Lantau Link is the cable-stayed Ting Kau Bridge, and the Cheung Tsing and Nam Wan Tunnels, the latter of which leads to the Stonecutters Bridge.

Interchanges

See also
 Route 8 (Hong Kong)
 Tsing Ma Control Area
 Transport in Hong Kong

References

External links

 Google Maps of Lantau Link

Expressways in Hong Kong
Route 8 (Hong Kong)
Lantau Island
Tsing Yi
Ma Wan
Extra areas operated by NT taxis